George Campbell Scott (October 18, 1927 – September 22, 1999) was an American actor, director, and producer who had a celebrated career on both stage and screen. With a gruff demeanor and commanding presence, Scott became known for his portrayal of stern, but complex, authority figures such as prosecutor Claude Dancer in Anatomy of a Murder, General Buck Turgidson in Stanley Kubrick's Dr. Strangelove, Herbert Bock in The Hospital, Ebenezer Scrooge in A Christmas Carol, Lt. Kinderman in The Exorcist III, and General George S. Patton in the biopic Patton, which won him the Academy Award for Best Actor. Described by The Guardian as "a battler and an actor of rare courage", his performances won him widespread recognition and numerous other accolades, including a Golden Globe, a Genie Award, and two Primetime Emmys.

Scott first distinguished himself as a stage actor in New York, both in Off-Broadway and Broadway productions. He earned the first of four Oscar nominations for only his second film role, in Anatomy of a Murder, and soon achieved screen stardom through a series of lead roles in films like The Hustler (1961), The List of Adrian Messenger (1963), Dr. Strangelove (1964), and The Bible: In the Beginning (1966). Though he won the Best Actor Oscar for playing the titular role in Patton, he became the first actor to refuse the award, having warned the Academy of Motion Picture Arts and Sciences months in advance that he would do so on philosophical grounds if he won. Scott believed that every dramatic performance was unique and could not be compared to others.

Scott continued to maintain a prominent stage career even as his film stardom waned, and by the end of his career he had accrued five Tony nominations, including four for Best Actor in a Play, earning his final nomination for playing Matthew Harrison Brady in the 1996 Broadway revival of Inherit the Wind. He directed several of his own films and plays and often collaborated with his wives Colleen Dewhurst and Trish Van Devere.

Early life
George Campbell Scott was born, the younger of two siblings, on October 18, 1927, on a kitchen table in the modest Wise, Virginia, home of his parents, George Dewey Scott (1902–1988) and Helena Agnes (née Slemp; 1904–1935). His mother was the first cousin, once removed of Republican Congressman C. Bascom Slemp. His maternal grandfather was a local jurist, Judge Campbell Slemp. His mother died just before his eighth birthday, and he was raised by his father, an executive at Buick. Scott's original ambition was to be a writer like his favorite author, F. Scott Fitzgerald. While attending Redford High School in Detroit, he wrote many short stories, none of which were published. He tried on many occasions to write a novel, but never completed one to his own satisfaction.

After high school, Scott enlisted in the United States Marine Corps, serving from 1945 to 1949. He was assigned to 8th and I Barracks in Washington, D.C., and his primary duty was serving as honor guard at military funerals at Arlington National Cemetery. He later said that during his duty at Arlington, "[I] pick[ed] up a solid drinking habit that stayed with me from then on."

Following military service, Scott enrolled in the University of Missouri on the G.I. Bill where he majored in journalism and then became interested in drama. His first public appearance on stage was as the barrister in a university production of Terence Rattigan's The Winslow Boy, directed by H. Donovan Rhynsburger. During rehearsals for that show, he made his first stage appearance—in a student production of Noël Coward's Hands Across the Sea, directed by Jerry V. Tobias. He graduated from the university in 1953 with degrees in English and theater.

Broadway and film career

Early performances

Scott first rose to prominence for his work with Joseph Papp's New York Shakespeare Festival. In 1958, he won an Obie Award for his performances in Children of Darkness (in which he made the first of many appearances opposite his future wife, actress Colleen Dewhurst), for As You Like It (1958), and for playing the title character in William Shakespeare's Richard III (1957–58) (a performance one critic said was the "angriest" Richard III of all time).

Scott's Broadway debut was in Comes a Day (1958) which had a short run. Scott's television debut was in a 1958 adaptation of A Tale of Two Cities for the Dupont Show of the Month directed by Robert Mulligan. He also appeared in a televised version of The Outcasts of Poker Flat (1958) plus episodes of Kraft Theatre, and Omnibus. Scott's feature film debut was in The Hanging Tree (1959), starring Gary Cooper and Maria Schell.

Supporting roles

Scott earned his first Academy Award nomination for his performance in Otto Preminger's Anatomy of a Murder (1959); later that year he appeared on Broadway in The Andersonville Trial by Saul Levitt directed by Jose Ferrer, winning critical acclaim for his portrayal of the prosecutor. This was based on the military trial of the commandant of the infamous Civil War prison camp in Andersonville, Georgia. It ran for 179 performances from December 1959 to June 1960.

Scott received good reviews for The Wall (1960–61) which ran for 167 performances. He guest-starred on episodes of Sunday Showcase, Playhouse 90, Play of the Week (doing "Don Juan in Hell"), Dow Hour of Great Mysteries, and a Hallmark Hall of Fame production of Winterset, originally written for the stage. Scott received superb notices for his performance in The Hustler (1961). He returned to Broadway to direct General Seeger (1962) by Ira Levin but it only lasted two performances. The play Great Day in the Morning (1962), in which he was directed by José Quintero, also had only a brief run.

Scott was in much demand for guest shots on TV shows, appearing in episodes of Ben Casey and Naked City. In 1962, Scott appeared as school teacher Arthur Lilly on NBC's The Virginian, in the episode "The Brazen Bell", in which he recites Oscar Wilde's poem "The Ballad of Reading Gaol". That same year, he appeared in NBC's medical drama The Eleventh Hour, in the episode "I Don't Belong in a White-Painted House". He appeared opposite Laurence Olivier and Julie Harris in Graham Greene's The Power and the Glory in a 1961 television production and also performed in The Merchant of Venice (1962) off-Broadway.

Stardom
Scott's first leading role in a feature was The List of Adrian Messenger released in 1963. That year, Scott starred in the hour-long television drama series East Side/West Side. He portrayed a New York City social worker, along with co-stars Cicely Tyson and Elizabeth Wilson. Scott was a major creative influence on the show, resulting in conflicts with James T. Aubrey, the head of CBS. The Emmy Award-winning program had a series of guest stars, including James Earl Jones. The portrayal of challenging urban issues made attracting advertisers difficult, not helped by the limited distribution. Not all CBS network affiliates broadcast the show, and it was canceled after one season. Scott had a success during 1963 in an off-Broadway production of Desire Under the Elms.

Scott's highest-profile early role was in the Stanley Kubrick directed Dr. Strangelove, or How I Learned to Stop Worrying and Love the Bomb (1964), in which he played General "Buck" Turgidson. In later interviews with Kubrick, Scott was revealed to have initially refused to camp it up on camera. As a compromise, Kubrick had Scott go over the top in rehearsal, assuring Scott that the cameras were off, which was untrue. Somehow, Scott was unable to hear the very loud motor on the 35mm film cameras of the time. Kubrick proceeded to use this version in the final cut, which Scott supposedly resented. Scott was one of many stars in The Yellow Rolls-Royce (1964).

Scott was cast, under the direction of John Huston in Dino de Laurentiis's The Bible: In the Beginning, which was released by 20th Century Fox in 1966. Also in 1966, Scott appeared as Jud Barker in the NBC western The Road West, starring Barry Sullivan, Kathryn Hays, Andrew Prine, and Glenn Corbett. He also guest starred in Bob Hope Presents the Chrysler Theatre. He co-starred with Tony Curtis in the comedy film Not with My Wife, You Don't! (also 1966) and as John Proctor in a television version of The Crucible (1967).

Scott returned to Broadway in 1967 to direct Dr. Cook's Garden by Ira Levin but quit during tryouts. As an actor, he appeared in a revival of The Little Foxes (1967–68) directed by Mike Nichols, which ran for 100 performances. Scott starred in The Flim-Flam Man (1967) and Petulia (1968). He appeared in the made-for-television movie Mirror, Mirror Off the Wall (1969).

Patton
Scott portrayed George S. Patton in the film Patton (1970) and researched extensively for the role, studying films of the general and talking to those who knew him. Scott refused the Oscar nomination for Patton, just as he had done for his nomination in 1962 for The Hustler, but won the award anyway.

In a letter to the Motion Picture Academy, he stated that he did not feel himself to be in competition with other actors. However, regarding this second rejection of the Academy Award, Scott famously said elsewhere, "The whole thing is a goddamn meat parade. I don't want any part of it."

The Best Picture Oscar for Patton was given to the George C. Marshall Foundation Library at the Virginia Military Institute in Lexington, Virginia, the same institution that generations of Pattons attended, by producer Frank McCarthy a few weeks after the awards ceremony, and is on display there. Scott did not refuse the New York Film Critics Award; his then-wife Colleen Dewhurst said, "George thinks this is the only film award worth having".

Early 1970s roles
During the early 1970s, Scott appeared in the made-for-television films Jane Eyre (1970) as Mr. Rochester and The Price (1971), a version of the Arthur Miller play. For the latter role, he won an Emmy Award, which he accepted. He also directed a TV version of The Andersonville Trial (1970).

Scott then returned his focus to feature films. He appeared in They Might Be Giants (1971) with Joanne Woodward, and The Last Run (1971) for director Richard Fleischer, with his wife Colleen Dewhurst and also with Trish Van Devere, who would become his fourth and last wife.

Scott then appeared in a series of box office flops, beginning with Rage (1972), which he both directed and starred in. He then appeared in Oklahoma Crude (1973) directed by Stanley Kramer; The Day of the Dolphin (1973) directed by Mike Nichols, in which Scott appeared with Van Devere; Bank Shot (1974), directed by Gower Champion; and The Savage Is Loose (1974), which co-starred Van Devere and which Scott himself directed. Scott returned to television with Fear on Trial (1975); and starred in the big-budget disaster movie, The Hindenburg (1975) for director Robert Wise.

Return to theatre
Scott had a big Broadway hit with Neil Simon's Plaza Suite (1968), directed by Mike Nichols. The show was composed of three separate one-act plays all using the same set, with Scott portraying a different lead character in each act; it ran for 1,097 performances. Scott directed a production of All God's Chillun Got Wings (1975) which starred Van Devere and only had a short run. He directed and played Willy Loman in a 1975 revival of Death of a Salesman, for which he garnered another Tony nomination.

Scott received a Tony Award nomination for his performance as Astrov in a 1973 revival of Uncle Vanya, directed by Nichols, which ran for 64 performances. Scott starred in a well-received production of Larry Gelbart's Sly Fox (1976; based on Ben Jonson's Volpone), which ran 495 performances. Scott returned to Broadway for Tricks of the Trade in 1980 with Van Devere, but it ran for a single performance. However, a 1984 Broadway revival of Coward's Design for Living, which he directed, ran for 245 performances. In 1986, on Broadway, Scott did The Boys in Autumn in 1986. In 1993, he appeared off-Broadway successfully with Wrong Turn at Lungfish.

Television and supporting film roles
Scott appeared in a television production of Beauty and the Beast (1976), with Trish Van Devere. He later starred as an Ernest Hemingway-based artist in Islands in the Stream (1977) directed by Schaffner and based on Hemingway's posthumously published novel. He had a cameo in Crossed Swords (1977) directed by Fleischer, then had the lead in Movie Movie (1978) directed by Stanley Donen, costarring with Van Devere, and Hardcore (1979) written and directed by Paul Schrader.

Scott starred in The Changeling (1980), with Melvyn Douglas, John Colicos, Jean Marsh, and Van Devere, for which he received the Canadian Genie Award for Best Foreign Film Actor for his performance. He followed this with The Formula (1980) co-starring Marlon Brando, which was a flop. With one exception, it was the last time he had the lead in a major studio feature film.

Scott appeared alongside Timothy Hutton and rising stars Sean Penn and Tom Cruise in the coming-of-age film Taps (1981), and was cast as Fagin in the CBS made-for-TV adaptation of Charles Dickens' Oliver Twist (1982). On Broadway, he starred in and directed a successful revival of Noël Coward's Present Laughter which ran during 1982–83. He starred in China Rose (1983) on television, and in 1984, had a supporting role in Firestarter and portrayed Ebenezer Scrooge in a television adaptation of A Christmas Carol. He was nominated for an Emmy Award for the role. Scott played the title role in the made-for-television-movie Mussolini: The Untold Story (1985).

Scott reprised his role as Patton in a made-for-television sequel, The Last Days of Patton (1986). Based on the final weeks of Patton's life after being mortally injured in a car accident, it contains flashbacks of Patton's life. At the time the sequel was aired, Scott mentioned in a TV Guide interview that he told the academy to donate his Oscar to the Patton Museum, but since the instructions were never put in writing, it was never delivered.

On television, Scott did The Murders in the Rue Morgue (1986) and Pals (1987; with Don Ameche). He also played the lead role in the TV series Mr. President (1987–88), which ran for 24 turbulent episodes. He was also on the Johnny Carson Show in March 1987. Scott starred in the television film The Ryan White Story (1989) as Charles Vaughan, the lawyer defending Ryan White. The following year, in 1990, he voiced two villainous roles: Smoke in the television special Cartoon All-Stars to the Rescue and Percival McLeach in the Disney film The Rescuers Down Under.

1990s
He was featured in The Exorcist III (1990). For TV, he starred in Descending Angel (also 1990) and Finding the Way Home (1991). On Broadway, he directed and appeared in a revival of On Borrowed Time (1991–92). He had a supporting role in Curacao (1993) and Malice (1993). Scott had a starring role in Traps (1994) but the series only ran for five episodes. He also had a semi-regular role on another short-lived series New York News (1995). Around this time, Scott appeared in such feature films as The Whipping Boy (1994), Tyson (1995), and Angus (1995).

Final performances
Scott received another Tony nomination for his performance as Henry Drummond in a revival of Inherit the Wind (1996). In the latter play, he had to miss many performances due to illness, with his role being taken over by National Actors Theatre artistic director Tony Randall. In 1996, he received an honorary Drama Desk Award for a lifetime devotion to theatre.

On the small screen, he did Country Justice (1996), Titanic (1996) (as the ship's captain), and The Searchers (1996). Scott portrayed Juror No. 3 in the TV-movie 12 Angry Men (1997), the role played by Lee J. Cobb in the 1957 film, for which he would win another Emmy Award.

He hosted Weapons at War on A&E TV, but was replaced after one season by Gerald McRaney. Weapons at War moved to The History Channel with Scott still credited as host for the first season. Scott was replaced by Robert Conrad after his death in 1999. He had support roles in Gloria (1999) for Sidney Lumet and Rocky Marciano (1999). Scott made his last film, the TV movie Inherit the Wind (1999), portraying Matthew Harrison Brady (ironically opposite the role he had played on stage) with Jack Lemmon as Henry Drummond, with whom he had also worked in 12 Angry Men.

Scott had a reputation for being moody and mercurial while on the set. "There is no question you get pumped up by the recognition ... Then a self-loathing sets in when you realize you're enjoying it", he was quoted as saying. One anecdote relates that one of his stage co-stars, Maureen Stapleton, told the director of Neil Simon's Plaza Suite, "I don't know what to do – I'm scared of him." The director, Mike Nichols, replied, "My dear, everyone is scared of George C. Scott."

Personal life

Scott was married five times:
 Carolyn Hughes (m. 1951–1955); one daughter, Victoria (b. December 19, 1952).
 Patricia Reed (m. 1955–1960); two children, Matthew (b. May 27, 1957) and actress Devon Scott (b. November 29, 1958).
 Colleen Dewhurst (m. 1960–1965); two sons, writer Alexander Scott (b. August 1960), and actor Campbell Scott (b. July 19, 1961). Dewhurst nicknamed her husband "G.C."
 Colleen Dewhurst (remarried July 4, 1967 - divorced for a second time on February 2, 1972).
 Trish Van Devere (m. September 4, 1972), with whom he starred in several films, including the supernatural thriller The Changeling (1980). Scott met Van Devere while shooting The Last Run (1971), which also featured his ex-wife Dewhurst. Scott adopted Van Devere's nephew, George Dressell, and resided in Malibu. They remained married until his death in 1999.

He had a daughter, Michelle (b. 1954), with Karen Truesdell.

Politics
In 1982, Scott appeared in a campaign commercial for moderate Republican U.S. Senator Lowell Weicker of Connecticut. Like Weicker, Scott was, at that time, a resident of Greenwich, Connecticut. Scott identified politically as a moderate conservative and supported the death penalty.

Illness and death
Scott suffered a series of heart attacks in the 1980s. He died on September 22, 1999, aged 71, of a ruptured abdominal aortic aneurysm. He was interred in the Westwood Village Memorial Park Cemetery in Westwood, California, in a grave (the grave bears no name, but is marked) located to the northeast (or left, looking toward the gravestones) of the grave where Walter Matthau would be buried nearly a year later.

Partial filmography

Awards and nominations

Notes

References

External links

 
 
 
 , movie clip compilation

1927 births
1999 deaths
People from Wise, Virginia
Film directors from Virginia
Male actors from Virginia
American male film actors
American male stage actors
Audiobook narrators
Best Actor Academy Award winners
Best Drama Actor Golden Globe (film) winners
Best Supporting Actor Golden Globe (television) winners
Burials at Westwood Village Memorial Park Cemetery
Connecticut Republicans
Obie Award recipients
United States Marines
American people of German descent
Deaths from abdominal aortic aneurysm
Outstanding Performance by a Lead Actor in a Miniseries or Movie Primetime Emmy Award winners
Outstanding Performance by a Supporting Actor in a Miniseries or Movie Primetime Emmy Award winners
Best Performance by a Foreign Actor Genie Award winners
University of Missouri alumni
Missouri School of Journalism alumni
20th-century American male actors
American male comedy actors
American male voice actors
Redford High School alumni